NeutrAvidin protein is a deglycosylated version of chicken avidin, with a mass of approximately 60,000 daltons. As a result of carbohydrate removal, lectin binding is reduced to undetectable levels, yet biotin binding affinity is retained because the carbohydrate is not necessary for this activity. Avidin has a high pI but NeutrAvidin has a near-neutral pI (pH 6.3), minimizing non-specific interactions with the negatively-charged cell surface or with DNA/RNA. Neutravidin still has lysine residues that remain available for derivatization or conjugation.

Like avidin itself, NeutrAvidin is a tetramer with a strong affinity for biotin (Kd = 10−15 M). In biochemical applications, streptavidin, which also binds very tightly to biotin, may be used interchangeably with NeutrAvidin.

Avidin immobilized onto solid supports is also used as purification media to capture biotin-labelled protein or nucleic acid molecules. For example, cell surface proteins can be specifically labelled with membrane-impermeable biotin reagent, then specifically captured using a NeutrAvidin support.

References 
 Bayer, Ed: "The Avidin-Biotin Complex", Dept. of Biological Chemistry, Weizmann Institute of Science, Israel

Y. Hiller, J.M. Gershoni, E.A. Bayer, M. Wilchek Biochem. J., 248 (1987), pp. 167–171

E.A. Bayer, F. De Meester, T. Kulik, M. Wilchek Appl. Biochem. Biotechnol., 53 (1995), pp. 1–9

A.T. Marttilaa et al. FEBS Letters 467 (2000), pp. 31–36 Recombinant NeutraLite Avidin: a non-glycosylated, acidic mutant of chicken avidin that exhibits high affinity for biotin and low non-specific binding properties

Proteins